This list includes the notable Turkish poets.

Ahmet Emin Atasoy (1944-)
Behçet Aysan (1949-1993)
Yahya Kemal Beyatlı (1884–1958)
Asım Bezirci (1927-1993)
Ahmet Haşim (1885–1933)
Faruk Nafiz Çamlıbel (1898–1973)
Nazım Hikmet (1902–1963)
Necip Fazıl Kısakürek (1904–1983)
Sait Faik Abasıyanık (1906–1954)
Asaf Hâlet Çelebi (1907–1958)
Ahmet Muhip Dıranas (1908–1980)
Cahit Sıtkı Tarancı (1910–1956)
Rıfat Ilgaz (1911–1993)
Fazıl Hüsnü Dağlarca (1915–2008)
Orhan Veli Kanık (1914–1950)
Oktay Rifat Horozcu (1914–1988)
Baki Süha Ediboğlu (1915–1972)
Melih Cevdet Anday (1915–2002)
Behçet Necatigil (1916–1979)
Cahit Külebi (1917–1997)
İlhan Berk (1918–2008)
Attila İlhan, (1925–2005)
Ümit Yaşar Oğuzcan, (1926-1984)
Ahmet Arif, (1927–1991)
Edip Cansever, (1928–1986)
Ece Ayhan, (1931–2002)
Cemal Süreya, (1931–1990)
Sezai Karakoç, (born 1933)
Gülten Akın, (1933–2015)
Onat Kutlar (1936–1995)
Cahit Zarifoğlu, (1940–1987)
İsmet Özel, (born 1944)
Ali F. Bilir, (born 1945)
Enis Batur, (born 1952)
Lale Müldür, (born 1956)
Haydar Ergülen, (born 1956)
Seyhan Erözçelik, (1962–2011)
Ahmet Yalçınkaya, (born 1963)
Birhan Keskin, (born 1963)
Seyhan Kurt, (born 1971)
Kenan Yücel, (born 1974)
Nurduran Duman, (born 1974)
İbrahim Halil Baran, (born 1981)
Süreyya Aylin Antmen, (born 1981)

See also
List of Ottoman poets

+
Turkish
Poets